{{Infobox spaceflight
| name                  = STS-90 
| names_list            = Space Transportation System-90
| image                 = Sunrise over Spacelab.jpg
| image_caption         = Spacelab Module LM2 in Columbias payload bay, serving as the Neurolab
| insignia              = Sts-90-patch.svg

| spacecraft            = 
| mission_type          = Bioscience research
| operator              = NASA
| COSPAR_ID             = 1998-022A
| SATCAT                = 25297
| orbits_completed      = 
| distance_travelled    = 
| mission_duration      = 15 days, 21 hours, 50 minutes, 58 seconds
| launch_mass           = 
| landing_mass          = 
| payload_mass          = 

| launch_site           = Kennedy LC-39B
| launch_date           =  UTC

| landing_date          =  UTC
| landing_site          = Kennedy SLF Runway 33

| crew_size             = 7
| crew_members          = 
| crew_photo            = STS-90 crew.jpg
| crew_photo_caption    = Left to right – Front row: Altman, Searfoss; Back row: Pawelczyk, Linnehan, Hire, Williams, Buckey

| apsis                 = gee
| orbit_epoch           = 
| orbit_reference       = Geocentric
| orbit_regime          = Low Earth
| orbit_periapsis       = 
| orbit_apoapsis        = 
| orbit_period          = 89.7 min
| orbit_inclination     = 39.0 degrees

| programme             = Space Shuttle program
| previous_mission      = STS-89
| next_mission          = STS-91
}}STS-90''' was a 1998 Space Shuttle mission flown by the Space Shuttle Columbia. The 16-day mission marked the last flight of the European Space Agency's Spacelab laboratory module, which had first flown on Columbia on STS-9, and was also the last daytime landing for Columbia.

Crew

Backup crew

Mission highlights
Neurolab was a Spacelab module mission focusing on the effects of microgravity on the nervous system. The goals of Neurolab were to study basic research questions and to increase the understanding of the mechanisms responsible for neurological and behavioral changes in space. Specifically, experiments would study the adaptation of the vestibular system and space adaptation syndrome, the adaptation of the central nervous system and the pathways which control the ability to sense location in the absence of gravity, and the effect of microgravity on a developing nervous system. The science lead was Mary Anne Frey.

The mission was a joint venture of six space agencies and seven U.S. research agencies. Investigator teams from nine countries would conduct 31 studies in the microgravity environment of space. Other agencies participating in the mission included six institutes of the National Institutes of Health, the National Science Foundation, and the Office of Naval Research, as well as the space agencies of Canada, France, Germany, and Japan, and the European Space Agency.

Neurolab's 26 experiments targeted one of the most complex and least understood parts of the human body – the nervous system. Primary goals were to conduct basic research in neurosciences and expand understanding of how the nervous system develops and functions in space. Test subjects were rats, mice, crickets, snails, two kinds of fish and the crew members themselves. Cooperative effort of NASA, several domestic partners and the space agencies of Canada (CSA), France (CNES) and Germany (DLR), as well as the European Space Agency (ESA) and the National Space Development Agency of Japan (NASDA). Most experiments conducted in pressurized Spacelab long module located in Columbia's payload bay. This was the 16th and last scheduled flight of the ESA-developed Spacelab module although Spacelab pallets would continue to be used on the International Space Station.

Research conducted as planned, with the exception of the Mammalian Development Team, which had to reprioritize science activities because of the unexpected high mortality rate of neonatal rats on board.

Other payloads included the Shuttle Vibration Forces experiment, the Bioreactor Demonstration System-04, and three Get-Away Special (GAS) canister investigations.

STS-90 was the first mission to make an Orbital Maneuvering System (OMS) assist burn during the ascent.

Three of the seven STS-90 crew (Williams, Pawelczyk and Buckey) appeared on the Canadian television series Popular Mechanics for Kids''. Working with engineers on the ground a week into the flight, the on-orbit crew used aluminum tape to bypass a suspect valve in the Regenerative Carbon Dioxide Removal System that had threatened to cut short the mission.

Mission Management Team considered, but decided against, extending the mission one day because the science community indicated an extended flight was not necessary and weather conditions were expected to deteriorate after planned landing on Sunday, 3 May.

STS-90 Mission Specialist Kathryn Hire was Kennedy Space Center's first employee to be chosen as an astronaut candidate.

STS-90 was the first shuttle flight known to carry a bat on the solid booster. A bat suffered a similar fate during STS-119.

See also

List of human spaceflights
List of Space Shuttle missions
Outline of space science

References

External links

 NASA mission summary 
 STS-90 Video Highlights 

Spacecraft launched in 1998
Space Shuttle missions